A quantum jump is a scientific phenomenon, a transition between quantum states.

Quantum jump may also refer to:

 paradigm shift or quantum jump, a drastic change and advancement
 Quantum Jump, a 1970s British band
 Quantum Jump (board game), or Exorbitare, a 1981 board game 
 Quantum jump method, a technique in computational physics

See also 

 
 
 Quantum leap (disambiguation)
 Quantum (disambiguation)
 Jump (disambiguation)